United States national under-17 soccer team may refer to:

 United States men's national under-17 soccer team
 United States women's national under-17 soccer team